Roberto Oscar Ferreiro (25 April 1935 – 20 April 2017) was an Argentine professional football player and manager.

Playing career
Ferreiro played club football for Independiente and River Plate.

He earned 18 caps for the Argentina national team between 1962 and 1966.

Managerial career
After retiring as a player Ferreiro went on to become a manager, taking charge at Independiente in the 1970s. He led the team to a number of championships, including the 1973 Intercontinental Cup and Copa Libertadores 1974.

Later life and death
He died on 20 April 2017, at the age of 81,  5 days before his 82nd birthday.

References

1935 births
2017 deaths
Sportspeople from Avellaneda
Argentine footballers
Argentina international footballers
1966 FIFA World Cup players
Club Atlético Independiente footballers
Club Atlético River Plate footballers
Argentine Primera División players
Association football fullbacks
Argentine football managers
Club Atlético Independiente managers
Arsenal de Sarandí managers
Atlético Tucumán managers